In a zoological context, spines are hard, needle-like anatomical structures found in both vertebrate and invertebrate species. The spines of most spiny mammals are modified hairs, with a spongy center covered in a thick, hard layer of keratin and a sharp, sometimes barbed tip.

Occurrence

Mammals
Spines in mammals include the prickles of hedgehogs and among rodents, the quills of both New World and Old World porcupines as well as the prickly fur of spiny mice, spiny pocket mice and spiny rats. They are also found on afrotherian tenrecs of the family Tenrecinae (hedgehog and streaked tenrecs), marsupial spiny bandicoots and on echidnas, of the monotremes.

An ancient synapsid, Dimetrodon, had extremely long spines on its backbone that were joined together with a web of skin that formed a sail-like structure.

Many mammalian species, like cats and fossas, also have penile spines.

The Mesozoic eutriconodont mammal Spinolestes already displayed spines similar to those of modern spiny mice.

Fish
Spines are found in the rays of certain finned bony fishes including scorpion fish. The sting that is found in a stingray is a type of barbed spine.

Invertebrates

Spines are also found in invertebrate animals, such as sea urchins. They are a feature of the shell of a number of different species of gastropod and bivalve mollusks, including the venus clam Pitar lupanaria.
Spines are also found in internal organs in invertebrates, such as the copulatory spines in the male or female organs of certain flatworms.

Function
In many cases, spines are a defense mechanism that help protect the animal against potential predators. Because spines are sharp, they can puncture skin and inflict pain and damage which may cause the predator to avoid that species from that point on.

The spine of some animals are capable of injecting venom. In the case of some large species of stingray, a puncture with the barbed spine and the accompanying venom has occasionally been fatal to a human.

Animals such as porcupines are considered aposematic, because their spines warn predators that they are dangerous and potentially toxic. Porcupines rattle their quills as a warning to predators, much like rattlesnakes.

Treating injuries caused by spines
Because many species of fish and invertebrates carry venom within their spines, a rule of thumb is to treat every injury as if it were a snake bite. Venom can cause intense pain, and can sometimes result in death if left untreated.

On the other hand, being pricked by a porcupine quill is not dangerous, and the quills are not poisonous. The quill can be removed by gently but firmly pulling it out of the skin. The barbed tip sometimes breaks off, but it works its way out through the skin over time.

Human uses
Common uses for animal spines include:

Jewelry
 Bracelets, earrings, and necklaces made from these spines are very common
 Tribes from around the world use porcupine quills as jewelry for their body modification i.e. through the nose
Pens
 Some of the earliest pens were made from quills
 Quillwork, a form of textile embellishment traditionally practiced by Indigenous peoples of North America that employs the quills of porcupines as an aesthetic element

Sometimes :
Brush

References

Animal hair